Frode Kyvåg (born 8 September 1945) is a Norwegian team handball coach and sports official.

He was head coach for the Norway women's national handball team from 1974 to 1978. He coached the women's team of Bækkelagets SK from 1983 to 1988 and from 1991 to 2000, when the team had great success internationally, winning the EHF Women's Cup Winners' Cup in 1998 and 1999. He has also been a handball coach for the clubs Nordstrand IF, Gjerpen IF and Fjellhammer IL.

He has been secretary-general for the international youth football tournament Norway Cup from 1975. He is also a former speed skater and competed for Nordstrand IF in the seasons 1958/59–1964/65.

In the 2015 Norwegian local elections he was elected as a member of Oslo city council.

References

External links
 

1945 births
Living people
Sportspeople from Oslo
Norwegian handball coaches
Norwegian sports executives and administrators
National team coaches
Labour Party (Norway) politicians
Politicians from Oslo